Maria Nepomuceno (1976) is a Brazilian artist known for her knitted sculptural works. 

She studied art at the Escola de Artes Visuais do Parque Lage in Rio de Janeiro.

Career 
Nepomuceno has had solo exhibitions at the Stavanger Art Museum, Norway, and at Turner Contemporary in Margate, England. Her work is included in the collection of Magasin III, Stockholm the Marcos Amaro Foundation in Itu, Brazil, the Rubell Family Collection, and the Pérez Art Museum Miami.

References

1976 births
Living people
21st-century Brazilian artists